The CSI 300 is a capitalization-weighted stock market index designed to replicate the performance of the top 300 stocks traded on the Shanghai Stock Exchange and the Shenzhen Stock Exchange. It has two sub-indexes: the CSI 100 Index and the CSI 200 Index. Over the years, it has been deemed the Chinese counterpart of the S&P 500 index and a better gauge of the Chinese stock market than the more traditional SSE Composite Index.

The index is compiled by the China Securities Index Company, Ltd.

It has been calculated since April 8, 2005. Its value is normalized relative to a base of 1000 on December 31, 2004.

It is considered to be a blue chip index for Mainland China stock exchanges.

Annual Returns 
The following table shows the annual development of the CSI 300 Index since 2005.

Constituents

Sub-Indices 

Moreover, there are the following ten sub-indices, which reflect specific sectors:

 CSI 300 Energy Index 
 CSI 300 Materials Index 
 CSI 300 Industrials Index 
 CSI 300 Consumer Discretionary Index 
 CSI 300 Consumer Staples Index 
 CSI 300 Health Care Index 
 CSI 300 Financial Index 
 CSI 300 Information Technology Index 
 CSI 300 Telecommunications Index 
 CSI 300 Utilities Index

CSI 300 Index also split into CSI 100 Index and CSI 200 Index for top 100 companies and 101st to 300th companies

Historical changes

References

External links
 China Securities Index Company
Bloomberg  index page
Index weighting download file

Chinese stock market indices
Shanghai Stock Exchange
Shenzhen Stock Exchange
Lists of companies of China